"That's What Love Is For" is a song by Christian music/pop music-crossover singer Amy Grant. It was written by three-time Grammy-Award winner Michael Omartian, Mark Mueller and Amy Grant and produced by Omartian. It was the third Billboard Hot 100 Top 10 pop single  from her 5× platinum-selling album Heart in Motion  and the only one from the album to be released to both Pop and Christian radio.

The song topped Billboard Adult Contemporary chart and was No. 1 for three weeks, starting the week of November 29, 1991. It spent a total of 13 weeks in the Top 10 and 32 weeks on the chart overall. The song peaked at No. 7 on the Billboard Hot 100 the week of November 23, 1991  and ultimately spent four weeks in the Top 10. It finished the 1992 Billboard Year-End Hot 100 Singles chart ranked at No. 91. In Canada, the song also topped the charts, reaching No. 1 on the RPM Magazine Adult Contemporary Chart. It peaked at No. 7 on the Pop Chart and was No. 61 on the RPM Magazines Canadian Top 100 Singles Year-End Chart for 1991.

There are two versions of the song, the album cut and the pop radio edit. For pop radio airplay, the strings were removed and the song was remixed with a new rhythm track.

Music video
A music video was produced to promote the single, and mixes shots of Grant wearing a red cloak and singing to the camera, while other shots of her singing are in black and white. The video was filmed at the Craters of the Moon National Monument and Preserve in Idaho. It also features a male/female couple, sitting together on a bench but not looking at each other. At the 3:12 mark of the video (just after Grant sings the bridge leading into the last chorus), the couple are seen in black and white, holding each other loosely while the music plays and Grant sings.  The video fades out on a shot of Grant singing ad-libs in front of a sepia-toned background.  Off in the distance is the man, and further off, presumably the woman. Behind them all are four large letters which spell the word "LOVE".

There are two versions of this video. One version has additional shots of Amy. One where she is in a giant, tall green dress. Another shot shows a black & white close up of Amy in a very retro-mod hair style.

Track listings
Remixes (featuring Chris Cox) – EP
"That's What Love Is For" (featuring Chris Cox) [radio edit] – 3:13
"That's What Love Is For" (featuring Chris Cox) [Mixshow edit] – 5:33
"That's What Love Is For" (featuring Chris Cox) [club mix] – 7:26
"That's What Love Is For" (featuring Chris Cox) [dub] – 5:41

UK retail single
"That's What Love Is For" (album edit)
"Baby Baby" (No Getting Over You mix)
"That's What Love Is For" (extended single mix)
"That's What Love Is For" (album version)

Personnel
 Amy Grant – lead vocals
 Michael Omartian – keyboards
 Don Kirkpatrick – guitars
 David Raven – drums
 Diana DeWitt – backing vocals
 Gary Chapman – backing vocals

Charts

Weekly charts

Year-end charts

Release history

References

1990 songs
1991 singles
A&M Records singles
Amy Grant songs
Song recordings produced by Michael Omartian
Songs written by Amy Grant
Songs written by Mark Mueller
Songs written by Michael Omartian